"GTO" is a song by American-born singer Sinitta. It was released in 1987 as the fifth single from her self-titled debut album. The song is about a girl whose boyfriend cares more about his car, in the music video a Ferrari 250 GTO, than her. 

The singer expressed her extreme dissatisfaction with the subject matter of the song when first presented with the idea by record label boss, Simon Cowell. Fearing that the title would mean nothing to her core audience of gay men and younger record buyers, Sinitta unsuccessfully begged producers Stock Aitken Waterman to retitle the track before recording.

Sinitta expressed greater satisfaction with the song's video, which had a substantially bigger budget than her prior efforts, boasting that the clip's solo ballet sequence was one of her most enjoyable pop star memories. Her opinion of the song greatly improved due to its positive reception by fans.

The song was a top-20 hit in the UK, peaking at number 15.

Formats and track listings
 7" single
"GTO" - 3:30
"GTO" (Instrumental) - 3:30

 12" single
"GTO" (Modina's Red Roaring Mix) - 7:30
"GTO" - 3:30
"GTO" (Instrumental) - 3:30

Charts

References

1987 singles
1987 songs
Fanfare Records singles
Sinitta songs
Song recordings produced by Stock Aitken Waterman
Songs written by Matt Aitken
Songs written by Mike Stock (musician)
Songs written by Pete Waterman
Songs about cars